Laboratory rats or lab rats are strains of the subspecies Rattus norvegicus domestica which are bred and kept for scientific research. While less commonly used for research than laboratory mice, rats have served as an important animal model for research in psychology and biomedical science.

Origins

In 18th century Europe, wild brown rats (Rattus norvegicus) ran rampant and this infestation fueled the industry of rat-catching. Rat-catchers would not only make money by trapping the rodents, but also by selling them for food or, more commonly, for rat-baiting.

Rat-baiting was a popular sport, which involved filling a pit with rats and timing how long it took for a terrier to kill them all. Over time, breeding the rats for these contests may have produced variations in color, notably the albino and hooded varieties.  The first time one of these albino mutants was brought into a laboratory for a study was in 1828 for an experiment on fasting. Over the next 30 years, rats were used for several more experiments and eventually the laboratory rat became the first animal domesticated for purely scientific reasons.

In Japan, there was a widespread practice of keeping rats as a domesticated pet during the Edo period and in the 18th century guidebooks on keeping domestic rats were published by Youso Tamanokakehashi (1775) and Chingan Sodategusa (1787). Genetic analysis of 117 albino rat strains collected from all parts of the world carried out by a team led by Takashi Kuramoto at Kyoto University in 2012 showed that the albinos descended from hooded rats and all the albinos descended from a single ancestor. As there is evidence that the hooded rat was known as the "Japanese rat" in the early 20th century, Kuramoto concluded that one or more Japanese hooded rats might have been brought to Europe or the Americas and an albino rat that emerged as a product of the breeding of these hooded rats was the common ancestor of all the albino laboratory rats in use today.

Use in research

The rat found early use in laboratory research in five areas: W. S. Small suggested that the rate of learning could be measured by rats in a maze; a suggestion employed by John B. Watson for his Ph.D. dissertation in 1903. The first rat colony in America used for nutrition research was started in January 1908 by Elmer McCollum and then, nutritive requirements of rats were used by Thomas Burr Osborne and Lafayette Mendel to determine the details of protein nutrition. The reproductive function of rats was studied at the Institute for Experimental Biology at the University of California, Berkeley by Herbert McLean Evans and Joseph A. Long. The genetics of rats was studied by William Ernest Castle at the Bussey Institute of Harvard University until it closed in 1994. Rats have long been used in cancer research; for instance at the Crocker Institute for Cancer Research.

The historical importance of this species to scientific research is reflected by the amount of literature on it: roughly 50% more than that on laboratory mice.  Laboratory rats are frequently subject to dissection or microdialysis to study internal effects on organs and the brain, such as for cancer or pharmacological research.  Laboratory rats not sacrificed may be euthanized or, in some cases, become pets.

Domestic rats differ from wild rats (various spp. of Rodentia) in many ways: they are calmer and significantly less likely to bite, they can tolerate greater crowding, they breed earlier and produce more offspring, and their brains, livers, kidneys, adrenal glands, and hearts are smaller.

Scientists have bred many strains or "lines" of rats specifically for experimentation. Most are derived from the albino Wistar rat, which is still widely used. Other common strains are the Sprague Dawley, Fischer 344, Holtzman albino strains, Long–Evans, and Lister black hooded rats. Inbred strains are also available, but are not as commonly used as inbred mice.

Much of the genome of Rattus norvegicus has been sequenced. In October 2003, researchers succeeded in cloning two laboratory rats by nuclear transfer. This was the first in a series of developments that have begun to make rats tractable as genetic research subjects, although they still lag behind mice, which lend themselves better to the embryonic stem cell techniques typically used for genetic manipulation. Many investigators who wish to trace observations on behavior and physiology to underlying genes regard aspects of these in rats as more relevant to humans and easier to observe than in mice, giving impetus to the development of genetic research techniques applicable to rats.

A 1972 study compared neoplasms in Sprague Dawleys from six different commercial suppliers and found highly significant differences in the incidences of endocrine and mammary tumors. There were even significant variations in the incidences of adrenal medulla tumors among rats from the same source raised in different laboratories. All but one of the testicular tumors occurred in the rats from a single supplier. The researchers found that the incidence of tumors in Sprague Dawleys from different suppliers varied as much from each other as from the other strains of rats. The authors of the study "stressed the need for extreme caution in evaluation of carcinogenicity studies conducted at different laboratories and/or on rats from different sources."

During food rationing due to World War II, British biologists ate laboratory rat, creamed.

Scientists have also spent time studying the thermoregulation of the rat's tail in research. The rat's tail works as a variable heat exchanger. The tail's blood flow is allows for thermoregulation to take place because it is under control of sympathetic vasoconstrictor nerves. Vasodilation occurs when the tail temperature increases, causing heat loss. Vasoconstriction occurs when the tail temperature decreases allowing heat to be conserved. Thermoregulation in the rat tail has been used to study metabolism.

Stocks and strains

A "strain", in reference to rodents, is a group in which all members are, as nearly as possible, genetically identical. In rats, this is accomplished through inbreeding. By having this kind of population, it is possible to conduct experiments on the roles of genes, or conduct experiments that exclude variations in genetics as a factor. By contrast, "outbred" populations are used when identical genotypes are unnecessary or a population with genetic variation is required, and these rats are usually referred to as "stocks" rather than "strains".

Wistar rat

The Wistar rat is an outbred albino rat.  This breed was developed at the Wistar Institute in 1906 for use in biological and medical research, and is notably the first rat developed to serve as a model organism at a time when laboratories primarily used the house mouse (Mus musculus). More than half of all laboratory rat strains are descended from the original colony established by physiologist Henry Herbert Donaldson, scientific administrator Milton J. Greenman, and genetic researcher/embryologist Helen Dean King.

The Wistar rat is currently one of the most popular rats used for laboratory research. It is characterized by its wide head, long ears, and a tail length that is always less than its body length. The Sprague Dawley and Long–Evans were developed from Wistars. Wistars are more active than others like Sprague Dawleys. The spontaneously hypertensive rat and the Lewis are other well-known stocks developed from Wistars.

Long–Evans rat 
The Long–Evans rat is an outbred rat developed by Drs. Long and Evans in 1915 by crossing several Wistar females with a wild gray male. Long-Evans rats are white with a black hood, or occasionally white with a brown hood. They are utilized as a multipurpose model organism, frequently in behavioral research, especially in alcohol research. Long-Evans consume alcohol in a much higher rate compared to other strains, thus require less time for these behavioral studies.

Sprague Dawley rat

The Sprague Dawley is an outbred, multipurpose breed of albino rat used extensively in medical and nutritional research. Its main advantage is its calmness and ease of handling. This breed of rat was first produced by the Sprague Dawley farms (later to become the Sprague Dawley Animal Company) in Madison, Wisconsin, in 1925. The name was originally hyphenated, although the brand styling today (Sprague Dawley, the trademark used by Envigo) is not. The average litter size of the Sprague Dawley rat is 11.0.

These rats typically have a longer tail in proportion to their body length than Wistars. They were involved in the Séralini affair, where the herbicide RoundUp was claimed to increase the occurrence of tumor in these rats. However, since these rats are known to grow tumors at a high (and very variable) rate, the study was considered flawed in design and its findings unsubstantiated.

Biobreeding rat

The biobreeding rat (a.k.a. the biobreeding diabetes-prone rat or BBDP rat) is an inbred strain that spontaneously develops autoimmune type 1 diabetes. Like NOD mice, biobreeding rats are used as an animal model for Type 1 diabetes. The strain re-capitulates many of the features of human type 1 diabetes and has contributed greatly to the research of T1DM pathogenesis.

Brattleboro rat

The Brattleboro rat is a strain that was developed by Henry A. Schroeder and technician Tim Vinton in West Brattleboro, Vermont, beginning in 1961, for Dartmouth Medical School. It has a naturally occurring genetic mutation that makes specimens unable to produce the hormone vasopressin, which helps control kidney function. The rats were being raised for laboratory use by Dr. Henry Schroeder and technician Tim Vinton, who noticed that the litter of 17 drank and urinated excessively.

Hairless rat

Hairless laboratory rats provide researchers with valuable data regarding compromised immune systems and genetic kidney diseases. It is estimated that there are over 25 genes that cause recessive hairlessness in laboratory rats. The more common ones are denoted as rnu (Rowett nude), fz (fuzzy), and shn (shorn).

 Rowett nude rats, first identified in 1953 in Scotland, have no thymus. The lack of this organ severely compromises their immune system, with infections of the respiratory tract and eyes increasing the most dramatically.
 Fuzzy rats were identified in 1976 in a Pennsylvania lab. The leading cause of death among fz/fz rats is ultimately a progressive kidney failure that begins around the age of 1 year.
 Shorn rats were bred from Sprague Dawley rats in Connecticut in 1998. They also suffer from severe kidney problems.

Lewis rat
The Lewis rat was developed by Margaret Lewis from Wistar stock in the early 1950s. Characteristics include albino coloring, docile behavior, and low fertility.
The Lewis rat suffers from several spontaneous pathologies: first, they can suffer from high incidences of neoplasms, with the rat's lifespan mainly determined by this. The most common are adenomas of the pituitary and adenomas/adenocarcinomas of the adrenal cortex in both sexes, mammary gland tumors and endometrial carcinomas in females, and C-cell adenomas/adenocarcinomas of the thyroid gland and tumors of the haemopoietic system in males. Second, Lewis rats are prone to develop a spontaneous transplantable lymphatic leukaemia. Lastly, when in advanced age, they sometimes develop spontaneous glomerular sclerosis.

Research applications include transplantation research, induced arthritis and inflammation, experimental allergic encephalitis, and STZ-induced diabetes.

Royal College of Surgeons rat

The Royal College of Surgeons rat (or RCS rat) is the first known animal with inherited retinal degeneration. Although the genetic defect was not known for many years, it was identified in the year 2000 as a mutation in the gene MERTK. This mutation results in defective retinal pigment epithelium phagocytosis of photoreceptor outer segments.

Shaking rat Kawasaki

The shaking rat Kawasaki (SRK) is an autosomal recessive mutant that has a short deletion in the RELN (reelin) gene. This results in the lowered expression of reelin protein, essential for proper cortex lamination and cerebellum development. Its phenotype is similar to the widely researched reeler mouse. Shaking rat Kawasaki was first described in 1988. This and the Lewis rat are well-known stocks developed from Wistar rats.

Zucker rat

The Zucker rat was bred to be a genetic model for research on obesity and hypertension. They are named after Lois M. Zucker and Theodore F. Zucker, pioneer researchers in the study of the genetics of obesity.  There are two types of Zucker rat: a lean Zucker rat, denoted as the dominant trait (Fa/Fa) or (Fa/fa); and the characteristically obese (or fatty) Zucker rat or Zucker diabetic fatty rat (ZDF rat), which is actually a recessive trait (fa/fa) of the leptin receptor, capable of weighing up to  — more than twice the average weight.

Obese Zucker rats have high levels of lipids and cholesterol in their bloodstream, are resistant to insulin without being hyperglycemic, and gain weight from an increase in both the size and number of fat cells. Obesity in Zucker rats is primarily linked to their hyperphagic nature and excessive hunger; however, food intake does not fully explain the hyperlipidemia or overall body composition.

Knockout rats

A knockout rat (also spelled knock out or knock-out) is a genetically engineered rat with a single gene turned off through a targeted mutation. Knockout rats can mimic human diseases, and are important tools for studying gene function and for drug discovery and development. The production of knockout rats became technically feasible in 2008, through work financed by $120 million in funding from the National Institutes of Health (NIH) via the Rat Genome Sequencing Project Consortium, and work accomplished by the members of the Knock Out Rat Consortium (KORC). Knockout rat disease models for Parkinson's disease, Alzheimer's disease, hypertension, and diabetes, using zinc-finger nuclease technology, are being commercialized by SAGE Labs.

See also 
 Laboratory mouse
 Animal testing on rodents
 Morris water maze
 Rat Genome Database

References

Further reading

External links 

 "Rat Genome", Nature
 Rat Genome Database, Medical College of Wisconsin
 Index of Inbred Rat Strains database, Jacskson Laboratory
 Rat Model Summary database, Knock Out Rat Consortium (archived copy)

 
Animal models
Articles containing video clips